Peng Kang Hill MRT station is a future elevated Mass Rapid Transit (MRT) station on the Jurong Region line in Western Water Catchment, Singapore.

It will be the terminus of the West Branch of the Jurong Region line. Trains entering service at this station will terminate at Choa Chu Kang via Bahar Junction.

History
On 9 May 2018, LTA announced that Peng Kang Hill station would be part of the proposed Jurong Region line (JRL). The station will be constructed as part of Phase 3, consisting of a total of 7 stations. A 4-station extension to Jurong Pier at Boon Lay and a 3 station extension to Peng Kang Hill from Tawas. It is expected to be completed in 2029.

This station was named after the nearby Peng Kang Hill, in the SAFTI Live Firing Area.

Contract J115A for the design and construction of Peng Kang Hill Station and associated viaducts was awarded to Hwa Seng Builder Pte Ltd at a sum of S$148 million. Construction will start in 3Q 2022, with completion in 2029. Previously, the station was to be built under contract J115 which also included the design and construction of a stabling facility next to the station and associated viaducts.

Initially expected to open in 2028, the restrictions on the construction due to the COVID-19 pandemic has led to delays in the JRL line completion, and the date was pushed to 2029.

Location
The station complex will be straddled over the existing Nanyang Drive, north of the junction with Peng Kang Avenue and Nanyang Link in Nanyang Technological University (NTU). It is located in the Western Water Catchment planning area, serving the Lee Kong Chian School of Medicine (Yunnan Garden Campus), Wee Kim Wee School of Communication and Information, and School of Electrical and Electronics Engineering.

Access to the station will be via 3 exits along Nanyang Drive.

References

Mass Rapid Transit (Singapore) stations
Nanyang Technological University
Proposed railway stations in Singapore
Railway stations scheduled to open in 2029